Insidious may refer to:

 Insidious (film series), a horror film series consisting of the films listed below
 Insidious (film), a 2010 American supernatural horror film
 Insidious: Chapter 2, a 2013 sequel
 Insidious: Chapter 3, a 2015 prequel
 Insidious: The Last Key, a 2018 sequel 
 Insidious (Mephisto Walz album), 2004
 Insidious (Nightrage album), 2011